Henrique Marcelino Motta (born 10 January 1991) is a Brazilian professional footballer who plays as a centre-back for Maltese Premier League club Zebbug Rangers.

Career
Motta started his career with Votoraty in 2010. In 2012, Motta joined Campeonato Paulista Série A3 club Comercial and appeared in three matches in the League.

He then signed with teams in the Brazilian League such as Duque de Caxias in 2014, Rio Branco in 2015, Mogi Mirim from 2015 to 2016 and São Bento in 2017. He briefly rejoined Mogi Morim in the same year.

Hoang Anh Gia Lai
In 2017, Motta signed a one-year contract with V.League 1 club Hoang Anh Gia Lai on a free transfer. and made his league debut for HAGL on 28 June in a 2–1 win against Becamex Binh Duong.

Persipura Jayapura
On 23 May 2021, Motta signed a one-year contract with Indonesian Liga 1 club Persipura Jayapura on a free transfer. On 29 September, Motta made his first league debut in a 1–0 loss against Arema as a substitute for Ricardo Salampessy in the 40th minute at the Gelora Bung Karno Madya Stadium.

References

External links
 

Living people
1991 births
Brazilian footballers
Association football central defenders
Campeonato Brasileiro Série C players
Campeonato Brasileiro Série D players
V.League 1 players
Maltese Premier League players
Liga 1 (Indonesia) players
Comercial Futebol Clube (Ribeirão Preto) players
Duque de Caxias Futebol Clube players
Rio Branco Esporte Clube players
Mogi Mirim Esporte Clube players
Esporte Clube São Bento players
Hoang Anh Gia Lai FC players
Olímpia Futebol Clube players
Associação Portuguesa de Desportos players
União Recreativa dos Trabalhadores players
Clube Atlético Penapolense players
Żejtun Corinthians F.C. players
Persipura Jayapura players
Brazilian expatriate footballers
Brazilian expatriate sportspeople in Vietnam
Expatriate footballers in Vietnam
Brazilian expatriate sportspeople in Malta
Expatriate footballers in Malta
Brazilian expatriate sportspeople in Indonesia
Expatriate footballers in Indonesia